Lupa (Latin for "she-wolf"; plural: Lupae) can refer to:

 a female wolf
 the goddess Artemis/Diana, in her "wolf form"; see Lupa (mythology) and e.g. Lupa Capitolina
 the lowest class of Roman prostitutes, see Prostitution in ancient Rome#Brothels
 Lupa a former genus of Atlantic crabs; see e.g. Callinectes sapidus formerly Lupa hastata, Portunus sayi formerly Lupa sayi, etc.
 Lupa (ship), an 18th century slave ship

Prostitution in ancient Rome
Roman mythology

ja:ルパ